Lecanora subcarnea is a species of lichen in the family Lecanoraceae.

See also
List of Lecanora species

References

Lichen species
Lichens described in 1792
subcarnea